The International Commission for the piercing of the isthmus of Suez (Commission Internationale pour le percement de l'isthme de Suez) was the commission consisting of various European experts convened in 1855 by Ferdinand de Lesseps as instructed by the viceroy of Egypt Muhammad Sa'id in order to ascertain the feasibility of a canal between the Mediterranean and the Red Sea and to evaluate the best alternative for such a canal.

Preliminary events 
The idea of digging a canal through the isthmus of Suez was attracting widespread interest throughout Europe in the early 19th century. Napoleon's surveyors in his Campaign in Egypt had found a difference of some 9 m between the levels of the two seas. The surveys made by Paul-Adrien Bourdaloue in 1847 during an expedition of the Société d'Études du Canal de Suez were the first generally accepted evidence that there was in fact no such difference. During the same expedition, Alois Negrelli, the Austrian railroad pioneer, explored the bay of Pelusium at the northern end of the anticipated canal. However, due to the political disturbances of 1848, the ideas were not pursued any further. On 30 November 1854, De Lesseps obtained from Muhammad Sa'id the first concession for a Suez Canal and on Lesseps' request, a first draft of the canal was made by Linant-Bey and Mougel-Bey (Linant de Bellefonds and Eugène Mougel), two high level French engineers in the Egyptian canal administration. From the outset, De Lesseps' main concern was to put the canal project on a political basis as wide as possible. Thus, in his second, more detailed firman of 19 May 1855, the viceroy ordered to further elaborate the initial draft and to submit it to an international commission of experts for discussion and evaluation.

Commission 

The Commission first convened in Paris on 30 October 1855. It consisted of Messrs. 
 Frederik Willem Conrad Jr (The Hague) (Chairman), 
 Captain Edward Harris (London), 
 Benjamin Jaurès (Paris), 
 Carl Lentze (Berlin), 
 Jean-Pierre Lieussou (Paris), 
 John Robinson McClean (London), 
 Charles Manby (London), Cipriano Segundo Montesino (Madrid),
 Alois Negrelli (Vienna), Pietro Paleocapa (Turin),
 Louis Auguste Renaud (Paris),
 James Meadows Rendel (London), 
 Charles Rigault de Genouilly (Paris).

The members had already viewed the initial draft of Linant-Bey and Mougel-Bey and decided to investigate the circumstances on the spot in Egypt. In addition, a map of the bay of Pelusium was to be drawn up in order to complete the soundings made by Negrelli in 1847.

Investigations in Egypt 
Five of the thirteen members met on 18 November 1855 in Alexandria, namely Messrs. Conrad, Renaud, Negrelli, McClean and Lieussou. Negrelli provided the soundings and the alignment of the canal which he had drawn up during his visit of 1847 and which corresponded to a large extent to the draft made by Linant and Mougel. During the next two days, the group examined the harbour and roads of Alexandria, and then went on to explore the bay of Suez during four days.

Subsequently, they went north to Lake Timsah and the Wadi Tumilat to make boreholes and subsoil investigations and to examine the line of a canal across the Nile delta to Alexandria proposed by Jacques-Marie Le Père and by Paulin Talabot. The members of the group did not take long to consent that this proposition was not acceptable because of various technical and economical reasons. They then proceeded towards the Mediterranean, making further boreholes and investigations. On 31 December 1855, the group was taken on board the Egyptian frigate Le Nil and arrived in Alexandria on 2 January 1856. The discussion on further soundings made in the meantime by Mr. Larousse, a French navy hydrologist seconded to the commission, came to the conclusion that the entrance to the canal should be moved further to the west (to the place of the present Port Said) because of the deeper waters, even if this added 6 km to the length of the canal. In addition, the entrance should be protected by a 3.5 km long northern jetty and a 2.5 km long southern jetty and a lighthouse should be built.

On 2 January 1856, a preliminary report was submitted to the Viceroy stating that a direct canal across the isthmus was the only reasonable alternative but that the details thereof would have to be set out in a final report yet to be elaborated on the basis of certain further investigations. The viceroy then issued the second concession to De Lesseps.

The commission's deliberations 
The complete commission convened again on 23 June 1856 in Paris (Rendel was excused, Negrelli and Montesino arrived the following day). During three days, the members discussed the result of the investigations in Egypt and all details of the future canal. The unanimous vote was for a canal as suggested by Negrelli from the outset, i.e. a canal without locks, passing the lower level Bitter Lakes (to be flooded by the canal) without any dams or dikes. The canal should have a depth of 8 m and its width should be 100 m at water level and 64 m at the bottom, however, in a certain section only 80 m at water level and 44 m at the bottom.

Final report 
 The final report containing 195 pages plus plans, technical tables etc., was published in December 1856. The report contains the reasoning for the direct connection between the two seas and all technical details of the canal, including ports to be built, telegraph lines to be installed along the canal, ferries to be introduced and finally the lighting of the Mediterranean coast and of the whole of the Red Sea to be provided, complete with lighthouses, buoys and so on. As already mentioned in the preliminary report, the name of Port Said was suggested as the name for the port on the northern entrance.

In the report, the commission expressly declared to have fulfilled their duties and to have finalised all their activities. They expressed their desire to have the canal be built in the near future, but have not in any way commented on the execution of the future works or on their management.

Notes

Sources 
The comprehensive final report together with the journal of the investigation group and the minutes of the deliberations of the complete commission have been published by Lesseps in.

Negrelli informed the K.K. Geographische Gesellschaft (Imperial Royal Geographic Society) in Vienna about the intended canal and presented them with a copy of the commission's final report. The society published the information in their own papers:

The illustrations are not available in the scans of the books mentioned below. However, in the (Dutch) report by Conrad there are many illustrations, available via  Wikimedia

References

Suez Canal